Avior Regional was a Venezuelan regional airline that was a subsidiary of Avior Airlines. It began operations in March 2015 with flights from Caracas to Barinas, Valera as well as Curaçao.

History
In 2012, after the bankruptcy and subsequent restoration of Avior Airlines that took place between 2007 and 2009, company executives proposed the creation of a regional subsidiary that would cover the demand for all destinations previously operated by its parent company.

On March 7, 2015, Avior Airlines announced the launch of subsidiary Avior Regional, which was intended to expand the parent company's domestic operations. Flights commenced four days later, operating from Caracas to Barinas and Valera. Avior Regional started flights to its first international destination, Curaçao, on July 16, 2015.

Since December 2, 2016, the airline has not provided commercial operations, it specified that the suspension was due to a restructuring with the purpose of improving air connectivity in regions to which Barinas and Valera offered services.

Destinations

Avior Regional flies to the following destinations :

Fleet
The airline operated the following aircraft as of September 2016:

See also
List of defunct airlines of Venezuela

References

External links

Defunct airlines of Venezuela
Airlines established in 2015
Airlines disestablished in 2016
Venezuelan brands
Venezuelan companies established in 2015